Timur Bilyalov (born 28 March 1995) is a Russian professional ice hockey goaltender currently playing for Ak Bars Kazan in the Kontinental Hockey League (KHL).

International play

On 23 January 2022, Bilyalov was named to the roster to represent Russian Olympic Committee athletes at the 2022 Winter Olympics.

References

External links
 

1995 births
Living people
Ak Bars Kazan players
Dinamo Riga players
Russian ice hockey goaltenders
Yuzhny Ural Orsk players
Ice hockey players at the 2022 Winter Olympics
Medalists at the 2022 Winter Olympics
Olympic silver medalists for the Russian Olympic Committee athletes
Olympic medalists in ice hockey
Olympic ice hockey players of Russia